St Teath and St Breward was an electoral division of Cornwall in the United Kingdom which returned one member to sit on Cornwall Council between 2013 and 2021. It was abolished at the 2021 local elections, being succeeded by St Teath and Tintagel.

Councillors

Extent
St Teath and St Breward represented the villages of Delabole, St Teath, Treveighan, Michaelstow, and St Breward, and the hamlets of Treligga, Westdowns, Treburgett, Knightsmill, Wenfordbridge, Penpont, Lank, Tresinney, and Watergate. The hamlet of Newhall Green was shared with the Camelford division. The division covered 8,527 hectares in total.

Election results

2017 election

2016 by-election
The 2016 by-election was called after the resignation of John Lugg.

2013 election

References

Electoral divisions of Cornwall Council